Isle Lake (also called Lake Isle) is a medium-sized lake in central Alberta. It is located about 80 km west of the city of Edmonton. The lake is fed by the Sturgeon River which eventually flows into the North Saskatchewan River. Some fish species that can be found in the lake are Walleye, Northern Pike, Yellow Perch, Lake Whitefish and Burbot.

Settlements

Some settlements around the lake area:
 Gainford
Lake Isle
 South View 
 Silver Sands.

The lake has many islands.

References

Atlas of Alberta Lakes

Lac Ste. Anne County
Isle Lake
Parkland County